Peptoniphilus catoniae is a Gram-positive and obligately anaerobic bacterium from the genus of Peptoniphilus which has been isolated from human feces from the Ica region in Peru.

References 

Bacteria described in 2016
Eubacteriales